Formation flying is the flight of multiple objects in coordination. Formation flying occurs in nature among flying and gliding animals, and is also conducted in human aviation, often in military aviation and air shows.

A multitude of studies have been performed on the performance benefits of aircraft flying in formation.

History 
Birds have been known to receive performance benefits from formation flight for over a century, through aerodynamic theory of Wieselsberger in 1914. 

Formation flight in human aviation originated in World War I, when fighter aircraft were assigned to escort reconnaissance aircraft. It was found that pairs of aircraft were more combat effective than single aircraft, and therefore, military aircraft would always fly in formations of at least two. By World War II, pilots had discovered other strategic advantages to formation flight such as enhanced stability and optimal visibility.

Mechanism of drag reduction 
It is a common misunderstanding to relate the reduction of drag in organized flight to the reduction of drag in drafting. However, they are quite different mechanistically.

The drag reduction occurred in the drafting is due to a reduction in flow speed in the wake of a leading vehicle, reducing the amount the flow needs to accelerate to move around the body, reducing pressure in front of the trailing vehicle. This leads to a lesser pressure differential between the frontal and rear projected surfaces of the body, and hence, less drag. This can also be understood somewhat tautologically through the common drag equation for a body , where  is the experimentally obtained unitless number,  is the density of the fluid medium through which the object travels,  is the cross-sectional area normal to the direction mean flow, and  is the speed of the mean flow. It can be seen by inspection, that a decrease in mean velocity will generate less drag force, as is the case with drafting.

In juxtaposition, the drag reduction felt by trailing agents in formation flight may be thought more of as the trailing agents "surfing" on the vortices shed by wings of leading agents, reducing the amount of force needed to stay in the air. This force is known as lift and acts perpendicular to the freestream flow direction and drag. These vortices are known as wingtip vortices and are formed by fluid flowing around the wingtips from the high-pressure region that is the bottom of the wing to the low-pressure region that is the top of the wing. The flow becomes separated from the airfoil and rotates about a low pressure wake that forms the core of the vortex. This vortex acts to change the direction of the flow for trailing aircraft, increasing the lift over a segment of the wing and allowing for a reduction in induced drag by lowering its angle of attack.

This can also be shown by the drag and analogous lift equation, . The difference now is that  and  vary linearly with angle of attack , which is the angle formed by the neutral axis of the aircraft and the freestream flow. Since the local flow is coming in at a higher angle of attack due to the vortex, both the lift and drag forces are rotated such that lift force vector generates a forward thrust and the drag force vector generates an increase in lift.

Nature

Migrating birds 

Birds are typically observed to fly in V-shaped formations or J-shaped formations, the latter commonly known as echelon. The first study to attempt to quantify the energy saving of a large flock of birds was Lissaman & Schollenberger who provided the first, albeit notably flawed, estimate for a 25-member flock of birds. A most impressive 71% range extension relative to single bird flight was reported. These reported extensions are typically due to using a fixed wing approximation. Haffner (1977) experimented with birds flying in wind tunnels and calculated a range extension of a more conservative value of 22%.

Studies have been performed on the phase of flapping and found that birds that fly in V-shaped formations coordinate their flapping, while those in echelon do not.  Willis et al (2007) found that optimal phasing of flaps accounts for 20% of power saving, suggesting that positioning is more important than perfectly caching the oncoming vortex.

Studies of birds have shown that the V formation can greatly enhance the overall aerodynamic efficiency by reducing the drag and thereby increasing the flight range.

Insects 
Insect swarms are a collective animal behavior that is an area of active research for the application of drones. The unique feature of insect swarms is their leaderless, yet organized flight. In a particle image velocimetry study of 10 midges by Kelley and Ouellette (2013), the boundaries of the swarm are statistically consistent even though the flying of the insects within the swarm are virtually asynchronous. There is also some suggestion of clustering, implying there may be some self-organizing behavior.

Aviation

Terminology and examples
The smallest unit of a formation is called a section or element, consisting of two aircraft; these pilots are a leader and wingman. A division or flight consists of two sections or elements. Multiple divisions or flights are assembled into a formation. A standard fighter formation includes aircraft whose positions are maintained by the wingmen to within  laterally and  vertically of the flight leader's aircraft. A nonstandard formation results when the flight leader has requested, and air traffic control has approved dimensions that do not conform with the stated boundaries; when operating within an authorized altitude reservation or under the provisions of a Letter of Agreement; or when flight operations are being conducted in a specially-designated airspace.

The fingertip four (or finger-four) is the basic four-ship formation that resembles the position of the fingertips with the hand outstretched. The flight leader (#1) is piloting the foremost aircraft (middle fingertip), with the lead's wingman (#2) to the side and trailing (index fingertip); the section lead (#3) is opposite the lead's wingman on the opposite side (ring fingertip) while the section leader's wingman (#4) is trailing the section lead towards the same side (little fingertip). The fingertip formation is designated strong right or strong left, depending on the side being flown by the section (#3 and #4) aircraft. For example, viewed from overhead, the fingertip four strong right formation from from left to right consists of the #2 (lead's wingman), #1 (flight leader), #3 (section lead), and #4 (section lead's wingman) aircraft.

The flight leader should decide and communicate which orientation, fingertip right or fingertip left, should be used as the basic formation prior to flight operations. Formations should transition to and from the basic formation to facilitate the use of hand and plane signals.

Military

In military aviation, tactical formation flying is the disciplined flight of two or more aircraft under the command of a flight leader. Military pilots use tactical formations for mutual defense and concentration of firepower.

Unmanned aerial vehicles

The challenge of achieving safe formation flight by unmanned aerial vehicles  has been extensively investigated in the 21st century with aircraft and spacecraft systems. For aerial vehicles the advantages of performing formation flight include fuel saving, improved efficiency in air traffic control and cooperative task allocation. For space vehicles precise control of formation flight may enable future large aperture space telescopes, variable baseline space interferometers, autonomous rendezvous and docking and robotic assembly of space structures. One of the simplest formations used is where autonomous aircraft maintain formation with a lead aircraft which may itself be autonomous.

Civil aviation 

In civil aviation, formation flying is proposed to reduce fuel use by minimizing drag. Formation flying is performed at air shows or for recreation.

In the early 2000s, NASA's Autonomous Formation Flight program used a pair of F/A-18s.
In 2013, the Air Force Research Laboratory's Surfing Aircraft Vortices for Energy project showed 10–15% in fuel savings, installed on two Boeing C-17 Globemaster IIIs.
In 2017, NASA measured 8–10% lower fuel flow  with two Gulfstream III aircraft on wake surfing test flights.
In 2018, the ecoDemonstrator, a Boeing 777F freighter from FedEx Express, had its fuel consumption reduced by 5–10% with the autopilot maintaining the  separation based on ADS-B and TCAS information.

By taking advantage of wake updraft like migrating birds (biomimicry), Airbus believes an aircraft can save 5–10% of fuel by flying  behind the preceding one.
After A380s tests showing 12% savings, it launched its 'fello'fly' project in November 2019 for test flights in 2020 with two A350s, before transatlantic flight trials with airlines in 2021.
Certification for shorter separation is enabled by ADS-B in oceanic airspace, and the only modification required would be flight control systems software.
Comfort would not be affected and trials are limited to two aircraft to reduce complexity but the concept could be expanded to include more.
Commercial operations could begin in 2025 with airline schedule adjustments, and other manufacturers' aircraft could be included.

Partly funded by the EU SESAR air traffic management research, Airbus' Geese initiative will include Air France and French Bee A350s for flight trials in 2025 to 2026, and will include Boeing for interoperability.

See also
Aerobatics
Finger-four
Flypast
Satellite formation flying
Vic formation
Formation Light

References

Aircraft operations